The M75 is a short metropolitan route in Johannesburg, South Africa. It connects the suburb of Bryanston with the Sandton city centre.

Route 
The M75 begins at Grosvernor Road (M64) in Bryanston. It heads south as Cumberland Avenue hugging the Bryanston Country Club until the road splits turning south-east and becomes Homestead Avenue. Homestead reaches and crosses Main Road / Bram Fischer Drive (M71) and continues eastward passing the Sandton Medi Clinic and St Stithians College as Peter Place which ends as a T-junction with William Nicol Drive (M81). Here co-signed with the M81, it heads south through Hurlingham and Parkmore until William Nicol is intersected by Sandton Drive. Here the route leaves the M81 and heads eastwards to the city of Sandton and ends at Rivonia Road (M9) but the road continues east as Katherine Street (M85).

References 

Streets and roads of Johannesburg
Metropolitan routes in Johannesburg